This is a current listing of the media in Kouhei Kadono's Boogiepop series.  This metaseries currently consists of 22 light novels, 3 four volume light novel spin-off series, a live-action movie, two anime television series, four manga serials, audio CDs, and other books.

An oddity of the Boogiepop titles is that they are almost always made of more than one title, and often there is a mix of English and Japanese titles.  This list provides the English-release title, the Japanese title (and transliteration), with any further sub-titles below.

Light novels 
 1. Boogiepop and Others   10 February 1998;   14 February 2006; 
 An alien being chases an escaped clone of itself, a man-eater hiding in Shinyo Academy.  As students disappear one-by-one, people begin to wonder if they are being taken by the legendary Boogiepop.  As five different students try to understand different aspects of the puzzle, will anyone every truly know the truth of the events?
 2. "Sign"  10 August 1998;   21 June 2006; 
 A year ago, Boogiepop defeated Imaginator, however, it appears to be trying to return: Asakura Jin, who can see people's hearts as plants, is being visited by the phantom of Imaginator's last host.  Meanwhile, two agents from the Towa Organisation are trying to find Boogiepop.  Whilst Camille tries to lure out Boogiepop indirectly, Spooky E finds himself face-to-face with Shinyo Academy's shinigami.
 3. "Parade"  10 August 1998;   15 October 2006; 

 4. Does anybody really know what time is it?  10 December 1998;    19 July 2018 (e-book); 5 February 2019;  (print)
 Six children with the ability to predict the future, each in different ways.  One day, Boogiepop begins to enter their premonitions.
 5. Heartbreaker II  10 February 1999;   9 August 2018 (e-book);  5 February 2019;  (print)
 Teratsuki Kyouichiro, a man with connections to the Towa Organisation, constructed The Moon Temple, but has now suddenly died.  The building is to be demolished in a month's time, but an accident seals visitors to the building, allowing the King of Distortion to manifest.
 6. Boogiepop at Dawn  10 May 1999;   5 August 2008; 
 The prequel to the Boogiepop series.  A serial killer is stalking the streets, meanwhile Kirima Nagi is hospitalised with an unknown disease, and Miyashita Touka begins to exhibit unusual behaviour.
 7. Peppermint wizard, or Rize and fall of poor innocent puppet   10 August 1999; 
 After trying the Peppermint ice cream made by Kigawa Tosuke, Teratsuki Kyouichiro uses him to start a chain known as The Peppermint Wizard.  The ice cream is able to take away people's pain, but does not go unnoticed by the Towa Organisation.
 8. "The Embryo" 1st half -erosion-   10 December 1999; 
 A mysterious virus named Embryo begins infecting portable gaming systems.  Anyone exposed to this virus soon begins to develop special abilities.
 9. "The Embryo" 2nd half -eruption-  10 February 2000; 

 10. The Unusual Contact of Vermilion Hurt & Fire Witch  10 February 2001; 
 A prequel to Boogiepop and Others and Boogiepop Returns: VS Imaginator.  No sooner does Kirima Nagi return to middle school than a series of strange incidents occurs.
 11. Holy and Ghost are steeped in plastic crimes  10 September 2001; 
 A pair of delinquents seek to release an enemy of the world known as Rock Bottom.
 12. Welcome to Jinx Shop  10 March 2003; 
 Meet Oxygen, the head of the Towa Organisation, and learn about the Organisation's agenda: world domination.
 13. Lost in Moebius  10 April 2005; 
 Crossing over with the Night Watch Trilogy, Orihata Aya and a boy seeking vengeance on Boogiepop become trapped in a world known as 'Kiba no Ato'.
 14. Ark of Orpheus  10 April 2006; 
 A boy discovers his girlfriend is an MPLS, and both the Towa Organization and Boogiepop are after her.
 15. The Silent Pyramid  10 January 2008; 
 16. The Scat Singing Cat  10 December 2009; 
 17. Into The Lunar Rainbow  10 January 2011; 
 18. Paradigm Rust  10 September 2013; 
 19. Stalking in Decadent Black  10 November 2014; 
 20. Revolt of Alternative Ego  10 March 2016; 
 21. Rabbit Run Rapidly  7 July 2017; 
 22. Kingcraft of Panic-Cute  10 April 2018; 
 23. When Dizzy Thinks of Lizzy  10 May 2019; 

These serialized novels take place within the Boogiepop universe:
 Beat's discipline Side 1 [Exile]  10 March 2002; 
 Beat's discipline Side 2 [Fracture]  10 August 2003; 
 Beat's discipline Side 3 [Providence]  10 September 2004; 
 Beat's discipline Side 4 [Indiscipline]  10 April 2005; 
 Repent Walpurgis Fire 1 [Warning Witch] 10 August 2008; 
 Repent Walpurgis Fire 2 [Spitting Witch] 10 August 2009; 
 Repent Walpurgis Fire 3 [Dozing Witch] 10 August 2010; 
 Repent Walpurgis Fire 4 [Freezing Witch] 10 December 2011; 
 The Emperoider Spin 1 [Wormy Empire] 10 April 2013; 
 The Emperoider Spin 2 [Gravelly Empire] 10 June 2014; 
 The Emperoider Spin 3 [Haunted Empire] 10 December 2015; 
 The Emperoider Spin 4 [Fallen Empire] 10 January 2017;

Short stories 
 Metal Guru  18 June 1999
 LONDON CALLING  18 September 1999
 My Death Waits  18 December 1999
 Boogietalk, Poplife (in Petssounds)  25 February 2000
 CHARIOT CHOOGLE  18 March 2000
  25 September 2003

Anime

Boogiepop Phantom 

A month ago, an unknown pillar of light pierced the sky over the city. Now, strange events begin to take place. Some people are disappearing, others are beginning to show signs of highly evolved powers, while others are seeing apparitions of people who should be dead. Rumors circulate about urban legend Boogiepop being involved.

Boogiepop and Others 

Marking the 20th Anniversary of Kouhei Kadono's original novel debut, and announced at the Dengeki Bunko 25th Anniversary & New Work Unveiling Stage, a series based on Boogiepop and Others, Boogiepop Returns: VS Imaginator, Boogiepop at Dawn, and Boogiepop Overdrive: The King of Distortion aired from January 4 to March 29, 2019.

Film 
  11 March 2000  1 March 2005
 Based on the novel of the same name.  An alien and a man-eater are playing a deadly game of cat-and-mouse at Shinyo Academy, and the students are the ones who suffer as a result of this.  Is the legendary shinigami, Boogiepop, somehow involved in this incident?

Music
Two audio CDs have been released.

,  25 February 2000,  30 April 2002.

,  25 March 2000,  30 April 2002.

Books 
 Boogiepop wa Warawanai THE MOVIE Eiga Fanbook  1 March 2000; 
 The Art of Kouji Ogata Boogiepop and Others  20 April 2000;

Manga 
 Volume 1  1 February 2001;   24 April 2006; Volume 2  December 2002;   15 July 2006; 
 Based on the Boogiepop and Others novel.
 Volume 1  1 April 2000;   15 September 2006; Volume 2  15 December 2000;   15 December 2006

References

External links
Seven Seas Entertainment Boogiepop Page
The Right Stuf International Boogiepop and Others Page
boogiesite v1.0
 Forbidden Booklists of Boogiepop

media
Lists of anime episodes
Lists of novels
Anime and manga lists
Mass media by franchise